Alexander Khristoforovich Vostokov (born Alexander Woldemar Osteneck; ;  – ) was one of the first Russian philologists.

Background
He was born into a Baltic German family in Arensburg, Governorate of Livonia, and studied at the Imperial Academy of Arts in Saint Petersburg. As a natural son of Baron von Osten-Sacken, he received the name Osteneck, which he later chose to render into Russian as Vostokov (Ost, the German word for "east," translates to vostok in Russian). He liked to experiment with language and, in one of his poems, introduced the female name Svetlana, which would gain popularity through Vasily Zhukovsky's eponymous ballad.

During his lifetime, Vostokov was known as a poet and translator, but it is his innovative studies of versification and comparative Slavonic grammars which proved most influential. In 1815, he joined the staff of the Imperial Public Library, where he discovered the most ancient dated book written in Slavonic vernacular, the so-called Ostromir Gospel. In 1841, Vostokov was elected to the Russian Academy of Sciences.

Works
Vostokov's works on the Church Slavonic language were considered a high-water mark of Slavic studies until the appearance of Izmail Sreznevsky's comprehensive lexicon in 1893–1903 and garnered him the doctorates honoris causa from the Charles University and University of Tübingen.

Vostokov also laid foundations of modern Russian toponymy. In 1812, he published an article with the title "An example to the amateurs of etymology", where he argued that geographical names (toponyms) have repeating elements which he called formants and which help to restore the etymology of the name. For instance, the endings -va, -ga, and -ma in the end of such names as the Sylva, the Onega, and the Kama, may mean "water" in the languages these names originate from. Whereas this article did not get sufficient attention during Vostokov's life, it did subsequently receive recognition, and Vostokov is cited as one of the founders of toponymy in Russia.

References

1781 births
1864 deaths
People from Kuressaare
People from the Governorate of Livonia
Russian philologists
Members of the Russian Academy
Full members of the Saint Petersburg Academy of Sciences
Baltic-German people
Slavists
Demidov Prize laureates
Toponymists
Grammarians from Russia